The Nigeria Internet Registration Association (NIRA) oversees Nigeria's country code top-level domain, .ng. Registration of domain names are handled by NIRA certified registrars. It uses the Registry–Registrar–Registrant model in operating and managing the top-level domain.

History
The Nigeria Internet Registration Association was initially founded by a stakeholder-led organisation. The stakeholders were within Nigeria's Internet Community. It was later transferred to the current management as it became important for national resources to be handled by a government coordinated institution, National Information Technology Development Agency handled the transfer on behalf of the Federal Government of Nigeria.

It became an Incorporated Trustee on February 9, 2007 and currently has the following as Trustees: Sir Chima Onyekwere (Chairman), Mrs. Ibukun Odusote (Sec), Dr. Chris Nwannenna, Prof (Mrs.) Adenike Osofisan, Mr. Shina Badaru, Dr. Isaac Adeola Odeyemi, Yunusa Zakari Ya’u, and Barrister Emmanuel Edet.

Responsibilities
The Nigeria Internet Registration Association is responsible for the top level Domain .ng and also the following .mil.ng, .com.ng, .sch.ng, .gov.ng, .edu.ng, .i.ng, .net.ng through their accredited registrar.

References

External links
About NIRA

Organizations based in Nigeria